KPVN-LP (95.9 FM) was a low-power radio station licensed to Woodburn, Oregon, United States. The station was owned by Centro De Servicios Para Campesinos Inc. The station shared its program hours with KPCN-LP, a similar station owned by the Pineros y Campesinos Unidos del Noroeste; that station left the air on November 20, 2019, and was effectively replaced by KTUP (98.3 FM).

KPVN-LP had applied for a U.S. Federal Communications Commission construction permit to move to 95.9 MHz and decrease ERP to 28.8 watts, but instead turned in its license to the FCC on December 20, 2019. The FCC cancelled the station's license on January 8, 2020.

References

External links
 

PVN-LP
PVN-LP
Woodburn, Oregon
Radio stations established in 2006
2006 establishments in Oregon
Defunct radio stations in the United States
Radio stations disestablished in 2020
2020 disestablishments in Oregon
Defunct religious radio stations in the United States
PVN-LP
PVN-LP